Los Fresnos Consolidated Independent School District is a public school district based in Los Fresnos, Texas (USA).

In addition to Los Fresnos, the district serves the towns of Bayview and Indian Lake as well as the communities of Arroyo Gardens, Chula Vista, Del Mar Heights, Green Valley Farms, La Tina Ranch, Laureles, Olmito, and Orason. Portions of Brownsville and Rancho Viejo also lie within the district.

In 2016, the school district was rated "Met Standard" by the Texas Education Agency.

Schools

High School (Grades 9-12)
Los Fresnos High School (6A) (grades 11-12)
Los Fresnos United (grades 9-10)

Middle Schools (Grades 6-8)
Resaca Middle School
Los Cuates Middle School
Liberty Memorial Middle School

Elementary Schools (Grades PK-5)
Las Yescas Elementary
Laureles Elementary
Lopez-Riggins Elementary
Los Fresnos Elementary
Olmito Elementary
Palmer-Laakso Elementary
Villareal Elementary
Rancho Verde Elementary
Dora Romero Elementary

References

External links
Los Fresnos Consolidated ISD

School districts in Cameron County, Texas
Brownsville, Texas